State Road 268 (NM 268) is a state highway in the US state of New Mexico. NM 268's southern terminus is at U.S. Route 60 (US 60) and US 84 in Melrose, and the northern terminus is east of Ragland at NM 209.

Major intersections

See also

References

268
Transportation in Curry County, New Mexico
Transportation in Quay County, New Mexico